Albert Clifton Thompson (January 23, 1842 – January 26, 1910) was a United States representative from Ohio and a United States district judge of the United States District Court for the Southern District of Ohio.

Education and career

Born on January 23, 1842, in Brookville, Jefferson County, Pennsylvania, Thompson attended the common schools and Jefferson College in Canonsburg, Pennsylvania (now Washington & Jefferson College in Washington, Pennsylvania) and began the study of law. He served in the Union Army during the American Civil War as a second lieutenant of Company B, One Hundred and Fifth Regiment, Pennsylvania Volunteer Infantry. He was promoted to captain of Company K in the same regiment on November 28, 1861. He served until March 23, 1863, when he was discharged on account of wounds received in the Second Battle of Bull Run. He resumed the study of law and read law in 1864, being admitted to the bar on December 13, 1864. He entered private practice in Brookville in 1864. He continued private practice in Portsmouth, Ohio from 1865 to 1870. He was a Judge of the Scioto County, Ohio Probate Court from 1870 to 1873. He resumed private practice in Portsmouth from 1873 to 1881. He was a Judge of the Ohio Court of Common Pleas for the Seventh Judicial District from 1881 to 1884.

Congressional service

Thompson was elected as a Republican to the United States House of Representatives of the 49th, 50th and 51st United States Congresses, serving from March 4, 1885, to March 3, 1891. He was elected from Ohio's 12th congressional district for his first term and from Ohio's 11th congressional district for his two subsequent terms. He was an unsuccessful candidate for renomination in 1890. He resumed private practice in Portsmouth from 1891 to 1898. He was appointed by President McKinley as Chairman of the commission to revise and codify the criminal and penal laws of the United States on June 21, 1897.

Federal judicial service

Thompson received a recess appointment from President William McKinley on September 23, 1898, to a seat on the United States District Court for the Southern District of Ohio vacated by Judge George Read Sage. He was nominated to the same position by President McKinley on December 13, 1898. He was confirmed by the United States Senate on December 20, 1898, and received his commission the same day. His service terminated on January 26, 1910, due to his death in Cincinnati, Ohio. He was interred in Greenlawn Cemetery in Portsmouth.

References

External links

Sources

 
 

1842 births
1910 deaths
People from Brookville, Pennsylvania
Ohio state court judges
People from Portsmouth, Ohio
Union Army officers
Washington & Jefferson College alumni
Ohio lawyers
Judges of the United States District Court for the Southern District of Ohio
People of Pennsylvania in the American Civil War
United States federal judges appointed by William McKinley
19th-century American politicians
United States federal judges admitted to the practice of law by reading law
Republican Party members of the United States House of Representatives from Ohio